Protein Wnt-5b is a protein that in humans is encoded by the WNT5B gene.

The WNT gene family consists of structurally-related genes that encode secreted signaling proteins. These proteins have been implicated in oncogenesis and in several developmental processes, including regulation of cell fate and patterning during embryogenesis. This gene is a member of the WNT gene family. It encodes a protein showing 94% and 80% amino acid identity to the mouse Wnt5b protein and the human WNT5A protein, respectively. Alternative splicing of this gene generates two transcript variants.

References

Further reading